Shivanand Naik was born in Manki, Honnavar Taluk on 6 December 1962. He was elected as the MLA two times from Bhatkal Constituency as part of the BJP. He became the Minister for Small Scale Industries in 2006. He was also the Chairman of KSDL.

Shivanand Naik joined KJP in 2013 and joined JDS to contest an MP election from Uttara Kannada in 2014. Later, he withdrew his nomination papers and joined BJP.

References

People from Uttara Kannada
1962 births
Living people
Bharatiya Janata Party politicians from Karnataka
Karnataka MLAs 1994–1999
Karnataka MLAs 2004–2007